Bathytoma belaeformis is a species of sea snail, a marine gastropod mollusk in the family Borsoniidae.

Description
The length of the shell is 23 mm

Distribution
This marine species occurs off Cape Point, Republic of South Africa.

References

 Sowerby, G. B. III, 1903. Mollusca of South Africa. Mar. Invest. S. Afr. 2: 213-232.

External links
 

belaeformis
Gastropods described in 1903